Lindsay Hamilton Simpson Thompson AO, CMG (15 October 1923 – 16 July 2008) was an Australian Liberal Party politician who served the 40th Premier of Victoria from June 1981 to April 1982. He was previously the Deputy Premier between 1972 and 1981. 
 
Thompson was the longest-serving member in Victorian parliamentary history, serving a total of 27 years in the Legislative Council (1955–1970) and the Legislative Assembly (1970–1982). He had held the housing, education, police and treasury portfolios throughout his parliamentary career, and was notable for his actions in the Faraday School kidnapping as education minister.

Early life
Thompson was born in Warburton, a town north-east of Melbourne. His parents were both schoolteachers. His father died when he was two and so he was raised by his mother in difficult circumstances.

He won a scholarship to Caulfield Grammar School and eventually graduated as both school captain and the school dux. The school's new gymnasium was opened as the Lindsay Thompson Centre in 1997.

After service as a signalman in the Australian Army during World War II, he graduated from the University of Melbourne with degrees in arts (honours) and education. He became a school teacher, teaching at Malvern Central Primary School and later at Melbourne High School.

Political career

In 1955, he was elected to the Victorian Legislative Council in the Monash and Higginbotham Provinces as a Liberal, where he served until 1970, when he transferred to the Legislative Assembly as MP for Malvern.

In 1958, Thompson was appointed Assistant Chief Secretary in the government of Henry Bolte. He would serve as a minister without interruption until 1982, making him the longest-serving minister in Victoria's history. Of all the federal and state ministers in Australian history, only the South Australian Sir Thomas Playford IV, who served in cabinet without interruption from 1938 to 1965, and Queensland's Joh Bjelke-Petersen, in cabinet without interruption from 1963 to 1987, held ministerial office continuously for longer than Thompson.

Thompson then served as Minister for Housing from 1961 to 1967, when many of Melbourne's controversial public housing towers were built. In 1967, he was appointed Minister for Education and held the post until 1979, a record time. He presided over the major expansion of state education in Victoria.

Faraday hero
In 1972, a teacher and six school children were kidnapped at a school in the country town of Faraday by a man demanding a $1 million ransom. Thompson, as education minister, went to the prearranged site in Woodend and was ready to deliver the ransom personally, but the teacher and children had escaped from the van in which they were locked before that was necessary.

Thompson received a bravery award for his actions during the kidnapping.

Premier of Victoria
During the premiership of Rupert Hamer, Thompson was named Deputy Premier. At various times, he served as Chief Secretary, then Treasurer and Minister for Police and Emergency Services. On 5 June 1981, Hamer resigned under pressure from the conservative faction of his own party, and Thompson won a Liberal Party ballot to succeed him as Premier. The Liberals had been in power for 27 years and the new Labor leader, John Cain, was mounting a strong challenge to a government that was increasingly seen as tired and complacent.

Knowing that he faced a statutory general election within less than a year, Thompson waited as long as he could, finally calling an election for April 1982. At that election, the Liberals were heavily defeated, suffering a 17-seat swing, the worst that a sitting non-Labor government has ever suffered in Victoria.

Thompson resigned as Liberal leader and from Parliament on 5 November.

Thompson supported keeping the monarchy of Australia.

Awards
Thompson was made a Companion of the Order of St Michael and St George on 14 June 1975 for serving as a minister. He was made an Officer of the Order of Australia on Australia Day in 1990 "for service to government and politics and to the Victorian Parliament" and also received a Centenary Medal in 2001.

Throughout life, Thompson was an ardent fan of the Richmond Football Club, and he frequently traveled to Melbourne Cricket Ground to watch his beloved Tigers play.

He was a Number One ticket holder of the club and was awarded life membership in 1993. Thompson had a long association with the Melbourne Cricket Ground and was a member of the MCG trust for 32 years from 1967 to 1999, taking on the role of chairman between 1987 and 1998. Thompson laid the first stone to mark the construction of the Great Southern Stand at the ground.

Personal life
In 1950, Thompson married Joan Poynder, and they had three children; Murray, David and Heather. Thompson's son Murray was a member of the Victorian Legislative Assembly from 1992 until 2018.

Legacy
Many people  have commented on what an amazing, kind, but humble man he was.

At the funeral, among other kind words, former Prime Minister John Howard said, "I can honestly say I never heard anyone say a nasty thing about Lindsay Thompson, and I can tell you that has to be a first in Australian politics."

See also
 List of Caulfield Grammar School people

References

Further reading

External links
 Chubb, P., "A Sporting Chance", The Age, (Wednesday, 3 June 1981), p.11.

1923 births
2008 deaths
Premiers of Victoria
Members of the Victorian Legislative Assembly
Members of the Victorian Legislative Council
Liberal Party of Australia members of the Parliament of Victoria
Officers of the Order of Australia
Deputy Premiers of Victoria
Australian Companions of the Order of St Michael and St George
Recipients of the Centenary Medal
University of Melbourne alumni
People educated at Caulfield Grammar School
Caulfield Grammarians Football Club players
Douglas Wilkie Medal winners
Deaths from pneumonia in Victoria (Australia)
Australian people of Scottish descent
Leaders of the Opposition in Victoria (Australia)
Treasurers of Victoria
20th-century Australian politicians
People from Warburton, Victoria
Australian Army personnel of World War II
Australian Army soldiers
People from Yarra Ranges